Gretchen Andrew is an American artist. Her painting practice is mostly described as an exploration of search engine art and virtual reality.

Her work was exhibited in museums and galleries in Europe and the United States, including De Re Gallery, Arebyte gallery.

Biography
Gretchen Andrew grew up in New Hampshire. She studied Information Systems at Boston College where she attended on a track scholarship. Describing her degree she has said, "Information systems is all about how companies use technology for competitive advantage...translated into art, I'm asking how I can use information to create meaning."

Andrew worked in Silicon Valley at both Intuit and Google. After working there from 2010 to 2012, she left Google to become a painter. She has claimed to have developed her artistic technique by watching how to videos on YouTube. The idea that one can learn about all topics on the Internet was the motto of her artistic series "How to How to How to".

From 2012 to 2017 she apprenticed with London-based figurative painter Billy Childish who is still her mentor.

Work
Gretchen Andrew's paintings explore and manipulate the functioning of search engines, particularly Google Search.

Her first search engine art piece occurred accidentally when she would copy Billy Childish's paintings and title them as "After Billy Childish". Since internet technology was unable to grasp the nuance between original and facsimile, her versions popped up first when she searched for his paintings online.

In 2018 Gretchen's work then focused on the political and social impact of search technology, exploring in a paper with The British Computer Society the implications for artificial intelligence.

In 2018 she coined the term "search engine art" in a book she co-authored with Irini Papadimitriou through V&A Digital Futures.

In February 2019 Gretchen Andrew used her Internet Imperialism process to convince Google Image Search that images of her artwork are the most important visual content related to Frieze Los Angeles, the much-hyped international art fair. The digital performance brought her prominence with The Los Angeles Times, Hyperallergic, artnet, and others reporting on Gretchen and her practice.

She has manipulated the search results using search engine optimization techniques for the terms "powerful person", "made for women", and "frieze Los Angeles", among others. Her paintings and search engine art are said to relate to the art world in an aspirational way.

In 2023, she was part of the curatorial team of the Santa Monica Art Museum founded by art collector and businessman Christoph Rahofer and her work was included in the exhibition Looking West.

References

External links 
 Official website
 Gretchen Andrew's Collection "Made for Women"

1988 births
American women artists
Artists from Los Angeles
Boston College alumni
Internet art
Living people
Painters from London
21st-century American women